Kevin Robert Ackermann (born 24 May 2001) is a Swedish professional footballer who plays as a midfielder for IF Brommapojkarna.

Career
Ackermann started playing football as a five-year-old in Azalea BK. Ackermann then went to IFK Göteborg, where he spent seven years.

On 14 August 2017, 16-year old Ackermann made his debut with the senior team in Allsvenskan in a 2–0 home against GIF Sundsvall, coming on as a 92nd-minute substitute for Chisom Egbuchulam.

In November 2018, Häcken accepted a bid for Ackermann from the Italian ACF Fiorentina. However, during the medical examination it was discovered that Ackermann had a heart defect, which stopped the transition. He underwent an operation in Belgium on April 30, 2019 that fixed the heart defect. In August 2019, Ackermann returned to Häcken and was able to start training with the team again. He did not play any competition matches during the 2019 season, but in November 2019 he was selected for the first time in a year in the squad for a training match against Ljungskile SK. After the 2019 season, Ackermann and Häcken agreed to terminate his contract early.

On 3 January 2020, Ackermann was acquired by Örgryte IS, where he signed a three-year contract.

Career statistics

Club

References

External links

Kevin Ackermann at Lag Statistik

2001 births
Footballers from Gothenburg
Living people
Swedish men's footballers
Sweden youth international footballers
Association football midfielders
BK Häcken players
Örgryte IS players
Allsvenskan players
Superettan players